On August 24, 2022, eight people were killed in the city of Tuzantla, Michoacán, in Mexico, after a firefight between rival factions of La Familia Michoacana.

Prelude 
The state of Michoacán, in south-central Mexico, has had a heavy cartel presence since the early 2010s. The cartels in Michoacán often exploit the lucrative avocado trade, the largest export from Michoacán and an integral part of the state's economy. The dominant cartels in the area are La Familia Michoacana and Los Caballeros Templarios, both originating locally after incursions by Los Zetas and the Gulf Cartel. In early 2022, Tuzantla had seen cartel violence with an ambush on Mexican government arms inspectors raiding suspected cartel members' homes.

Shooting 
According to Mexican Deputy Security Minister Ricardo Mejía Berdeja, the attack began around 2:00pm local time in the town of Yerbabuena, before spreading to the town square of Tuzantla. The fighting began after a rival faction of La Familia entered the town, shooting at the Tuzantla-based faction. Four pickup trucks were torched, and civilians stated houses on the streets where fighting broke out were raided. The original dispute, according to Mexican prosecutors, stemmed from infighting between brothers Johnny "El Pez" and Jose Alfredo "El Fresa" Hurtado Olascoaga, leaders of the Tuzantla cell, and their former coworker known as "El Chaparro".

Aftermath 
The bodies of eight civilians killed during the fighting were discovered in a butterfly sanctuary near Tuzantla. The Mexican National Guard announced the creation of a new post in Melchor Ocampo, near Tuzantla. Michoacán security minister José Alfredo Reyes Ortega also visited Tuzantla after the attack, promising to bolster security.

References 

2022 murders in Mexico
Mass murder in 2022
Massacres in 2022
21st-century mass murder in Mexico
2022 mass shootings in Mexico
Attacks in Mexico in 2022
Victims of the Mexican Drug War
Crime in Michoacán
August 2022 crimes in Mexico
Terrorist incidents in Mexico in 2022